Sun Peaks is a mountain resort municipality in British Columbia, Canada. It was incorporated on June 28, 2010. It is built around Sun Peaks Resort. It is located 55 kilometers northeast of Kamloops and 410 kilometers from Vancouver. The municipality has a resident population of 1,404 people, with more than 900 additional non-resident property owners.

Demographics 

Religion 
According to the 2021 census, religious groups in Sun Peaks included:
Irreligion (960 persons or 69.6%)
Christianity (370 persons or 26.8%)

See also 
Jumbo Glacier, British Columbia, once incorporated as a mountain resort municipality
List of communities in British Columbia
List of municipalities in British Columbia

References

External links

Mountain resort municipalities in British Columbia
Populated places in the Thompson-Nicola Regional District